This is a list of flag bearers who have represented the Philippines at the Olympics.

Flag bearers carry the national flag of their country at the opening and closing ceremonies of the Olympic Games.

List
Key:

Regular Games

Youth Games

Notes

See also
Philippines at the Olympics

References

Philippines at the Olympics
Philippines
Olympic flagbearers